Adam Barton may refer to:

Adam Barton (footballer) (born 1991), English football player
Adam Barton (cricketer) (born 1995), English cricketer
Adam Barton (Emmerdale), fictional character in a British television soap opera